Lycus trabeatus, common name tailed net-winged beetle, is a species of beetle in the Lycidae family, which is native to the eastern, southern Afrotropics and Arabian Peninsula. They are diurnal, aposematic insects. Adults feed on various flowers and their nectar, while larvae live under tree bark, in dead wood, or in detritus where they may live on fungi.

Range and habitat
It is known to occur in Eritrea, Ethiopia, the DRC, Tanzania, Namibia , Oman and South Africa. It inhabits subtropical forests, savannahs and grasslands.

Description
The pronotum has a black center and orange edges. The elytra are black at their bases, on the apical lobes, and sometimes along the dilated edges. Elytra are variable in shape, from widely expanded with a constriction towards the apical lobe, to intermediate or slender. The black antennae are mildly serrate. Femora are orange and the lower legs are black.

Subspecies
There are two subspecies:
 Lycus trabeatus trabeatus
Range: eastern and southern Afrotropics
Description: Female's total length about 22 mm, pronotum 4 mm x 4 mm, elytron 18 mm long, dilated laterally, narrowing towards apical lobe.
 Lycus trabeatus matojoi
Range: southern highlands of Tanzania
Description: Female's total length about 18 mm, pronotum 3 mm x 3 mm, elytron 15 x 4 mm.

Gallery

References

External links

 Insecta

Lycidae
Insects of Ethiopia
Insects of South Africa